Quincy's Quest is a 1979 British family film directed by Robert Reed, and starring Tommy Steele, Mel Martin and Charles Morgan. A version was first shown on television on 23 December 1962 as The Tommy Steele Show: Quincy's Quest.

Plot summary
In a department store the unwanted toys are set to be destroyed. One of the rejects, a doll named Quincy, goes on a quest to find the store Santa Claus who is the only person who can save them.

Cast
 Tommy Steele ...  Quincy 
 Mel Martin ...  Rebecca 
 Charles Morgan ...  Narrator 
 Frederick Schiller ...  Smithy 
 Lila Kaye ...  Griselda / Mrs. Claus 
 Tony Aitken ...  Teddy / Father Christmas 
 Lance Percival ...  Jack 
 Aubrey Woods ...  Mr. Perfect 
 Matt Zimmerman ...  Conn 
 Leo Dolan ...  Soldier 
 Willoughby Goddard ...  General 
 James Woolley ...  Aide de Camp 
 Gretchen Franklin ...  Witch 
 Roy Kinnear ...  Top 
 Patsy Kensit ...  Jennifer
 Gary Fetterplace ...  Boy 
 Arnold Diamond ...  Manager 
 Jan Murzynowski ...  Smithy's Assistant
 Peter Hawkins ...  Voices

References

External links

1979 films
British children's films
1970s English-language films
1970s British films